The Chuanqing people are an East Asian ethnic group. According to popular ethnogenesis, they are descended from Han Chinese soldiers who were sent to Guizhou area in the eighth and ninth centuries to quell Miao rebellions. The Chuanqings, however, view themselves as a distinct people group. Most of them live in the Anshun area of Guizhou province. Other locals call the Chuanqings "Da Jiao Ban" (Big Foot) or "Da Xiuzi" (Big Sleeves). Uniquely, they worship a god called Wuxian.

Names
Their name, Chuanqing, literally means wear-blues because that is the colour of their traditional clothing.

The Liupanshui City Ethnic Gazetteer (2003:178) lists the following names for the Chuanqing people of Liupanshui prefecture.
Turen (土人)
Limin/Liminzi (里民/里民子) (里珉子) (some of whom call themselves Li 黎族)

The Chuanqing are also given various exonyms by the following ethnic groups.
Yi: Shaloumi (沙楼米)
Miao: Sagelou (撒格娄)
Buyei: Hayao (哈腰)
Gelao: Baosha (褒沙)

Distribution
The Chuanqing are believed to number about 700,000, mostly in mountain villages in and around Zhijin.

The Liupanshui City Ethnic Gazetteer (2003:178) lists populations for the following counties in Liupanshui prefecture.
Liupanshui City: 14,227 households, 71,457 persons
Liuzhi Special District: 2,466 households, 12,330 persons
Pan County: 811 households, 4,048 persons
Shuicheng County: 10,950 households, 54,752 persons

Language
The Chuanqing speak a Sinitic language. There is frequent SOV word order.

See also
List of unrecognized ethnic groups of Guizhou

References

 
Subgroups of the Han Chinese